The Battle of Deorham (or Dyrham) is claimed as a decisive military encounter between the West Saxons and the Britons of the West Country in 577.

Account
The Anglo-Saxon Chronicle (The A or 'Winchester Manuscript') entry for 577 reads:

"577 Here Cuthwine and Ceawlin fought against the Britons, and they killed 3 kings, Coinmail, Condidan and Farinmail, in the place which is called Deorham, and took 3 cities: Gloucester and Cirencester and Bath"

Deorham is generally taken to be Dyrham in what is now South Gloucestershire, on the Cotswolds escarpment a few miles north of Bath. This entry in the Anglo-Saxon Chronicle is the only evidence for the battle.

Historicity 
Some scholars have questioned whether the entry in the ninth-century Anglo-Saxon Chronicle records a real event. Patrick Sims-Williams has argued that the entry may have been a later invention incorporating elements of an early Welsh source for the names of the kings. The purpose of the entry may have been to legitimize West Saxon claims on part of the territory of the Hwicce in the ninth century.

Presumed strategy and tactics
The Severn Valley has always been one of the military keys of Britain, and some of the decisive battles of the Saxon conquest were fought to control it. In 577 Ceawlin advanced from the Thames Valley across the Cotswolds to seize the area and break the power of the Britons in the lower Severn area.

Some historians (such as Welbore St Clair Baddeley in 1929) have concluded that the Saxons may have launched a surprise attack and seized the hill fort at Hinton Hill Camp (Dyrham Camp) because it commanded the Avon Valley, and disrupted communications north and south between Bath and her neighbouring Romano-British towns of Gloucester and Cirencester. Once the Saxons were in occupation of the site (and had begun reinforcing the existing Iron Age defensive structures at the site) the Britons of those three towns were compelled to unite and make a combined attempt to dislodge them. Their attempt failed and the three opposing British kings were killed (they are named as Commagil of Gloucester, Condidan of Cirencester, and Farinmagil of Bath). Their routed forces were driven north of the River Severn and south of Bath where it appears they began the construction of the defensive earthwork called the Wansdyke in a doomed attempt to prevent more territory from being lost.

The military historian Lieutenant-Colonel Alfred Burne, employing his theory of 'Inherent Military Probability' opted for a simpler explanation for the battle than Baddeley. In his view Ceawlin was methodically advancing towards the Severn and the three forces of Britons concentrated to stop him. Burne suggests that they formed up along two slight ridges across the trackway that skirted the Forest of Braden, with Hinton Hill Camp behind them as their stores depot – a position similar to that adopted at the Battle of Beranburh in AD 556. Burne pointed out that if the Saxon attack drove the Britons back from their first line onto the second ridge near the edge of the escarpment, the slightest further retreat would leave their flanks open to a downhill pursuit. He speculates that this is what occurred, with the three Briton leaders and their main body being driven back into the fort while the flanking Saxons driving forwards swept round behind the promontory on which the fort stands. A last stand in this position would explain why none of the three Briton leaders was able to escape.

Outcome
However, archaeological evidence suggests that these towns had been largely abandoned in the early fifth century and lay in ruins by the late sixth century. Eventually the area became part of the minor Anglo-Saxon England kingdom of Hwicce.

Some academics believe the battle was also the starting point when Welsh and Cornish began to become two separate languages. Germanic-speaking Saxons now held the lands between the Celtic peoples in South West England and those in Wales and the English Midlands, whose territory would be conquered by the Angles of Mercia in the 8th century. Others point out that, transport by water being then less costly than by land, contact by sea was still readily available, and indeed a Welsh genealogy record states that a cadet branch from the kings of Dogfeiling founded a dynasty in the Glastonbury region in the 6th century and which survived until the late 8th or early 9th century.

In popular culture 
The Battle of Deorham and its aftermath features in the early chapters of Rosemary Sutcliff's historical novel Dawn Wind.

Notes

References
The Anglo-Saxon Chronicle
History of War article
From the Transactions of the Bristol and Gloucestershire Archaeological Society "The Battle of Deorham" by T. G. P. Hallett, 1883–84, Vol. 8, 62–73
From the Transactions of the Bristol and Gloucestershire Archaeological Society "The Battle of Dyrham AD 577" by Welbore St Clair Baddeley, 1929, Vol. 51, 95–101
Everything2 entry for the battle
 Lt-Col Alfred H. Burne, More Battlefields of England, London: Methuen, 1952.
 H. P. R. Finberg, The Formation of England, 550–1042, London: Hart-Davis, MacGibbon, 1974/Paladin, 1976.
 John Morris, The Age of Arthur: A History of the British Isles from 350 to 650, London: Weidenfeld & Nicolson, 1973, .
 J.N.L. Myres, The Oxford History of England: The English Settlements, Oxford: Clarendon, 1986, .
The Modern Antiquarian

577
570s
570s conflicts
6th century in England
Battles involving the Britons
Battles involving Wessex
Military history of Gloucestershire
South Gloucestershire District